VC Minyor Pernik is a Bulgarian volleyball club, section of the multi-sports club Minyor Pernik, based in Pernik.

History 
The club founded in 1919.

The golden era of the club was from the mid 50s to mid 60s where Minyor Pernik won seven championships and two cups in domestic competitions and also  the 1964-65 season was finalist of the CEV European Champions Cup.

Honours 

men's team

Bulgarian League
 Winners (7): 1954, 1955, 1960, 1961, 1963, 1964, 1965
Bulgarian Cup
 Winners (3): 1954, 1955, 1975
 CEV Champions League
 Runners-up (1): 1964-65

women's team

Bulgarian League
 Winners (4): 1949, 1953, 1956, 1960
Bulgarian Cup
 Winners (2): 1955, 1975

References 

Minyor Pernik
Multi-sport clubs in Bulgaria
Mining sports teams